Leposava is a Serbian female given name, derived from Slavic lepota, meaning "beauty". It may refer to:

Leposava Glušica (born 1982), Serbian handballer
Leposava Marković, Serbian judoka
Leposava Milićević, retired Serbian politician
Leposava Bela Krleža (1896–1981), Yugoslav actress

See also
Leposavić, town in Kosovo

Serbian feminine given names